The Cholmondeley Awards  are annual awards for poetry given by the Society of Authors in the United Kingdom. Awards honour distinguished poets, from a fund endowed by the Dowager Marchioness of Cholmondeley in 1966. Since 1991 the award has been made to four poets each year, to the total value of £8000.

List of prize winners

2000s

1900s

See also
List of British literary awards
British poetry
List of poetry awards
List of years in poetry
List of years in literature

References 
 
Awards established in 1966
1966 establishments in the United Kingdom
British poetry awards
English-language literary awards

External links 
Society of Authors Awards page
Complete list of past winners
Information from recent years